Ratti Gali Lake is an alpine glacial lake which is located in Neelum Valley, Azad Kashmir, Pakistan . The lake is fed by the surrounding glacier waters of the mountains.

See also
Chitta Katha Lake
Saral Lake

References

Lakes of Azad Kashmir